Mate Dolenc (born 5 October 1945) is a Slovene writer and translator. He writes novels, collections of short stories, children's books, travelogues and articles.

Dolenc was born in Ljubljana in 1945. He started studying comparative literature at the University of Ljubljana but never completed his studies. He worked at Mladina for a few years in the early 1970s. Since 1973 he works as a free-lance writer. He has written over thirty books, several screenplays and numerous articles. He is also known for his juvenile fiction. His passion for scuba diving is often reflected in the subject matter he chooses for his writing. The Adriatic and its islands have marked many of his books both for adult and young readers. In 2008 his two most successful novels The Gorjanci Vampire and The Sea at the Time of the Eclipse were made into feature films.

In 1986 he won the Levstik Award for his novel for young readers Morska dežela na železniški postaji (The Land of Sea at the Railway Station). In 1995 he won the Prešeren Foundation Award for his novel Pes z Atlantide (The Dog from Atlantis) and his collection of short stories Rum in šah (Rum and Chess).

Published works

 Menjalnica (The Exchange), short stories, 1970
 Peto nadstropje trinadstropne hiše (The Fifth Floor of a Three-Storey House), satirical novel, co-authored with Dimitrij Rupel, 1972
 Aleluja Katmandu (Hallelujah Katmandu), novel, 1973
 Razkošje v glavi (Luxury in the Mind), satire, co-authored with Slavko Pregl, 1974
 Nenavadna Slovenija (Unusual Slovenia), satire, co-authored with Slavko Pregl, 1974
 Potopljeni otok (The Sunken Island), short stories, 1976
 Vampir z Gorjancev (The Gorjanci Vampire), novel, 1979, 2004
 Gorenčev vrag (Gorenc's Devil), short stories, 1977
 Vloga mojih škornjev v angolski revoluciji (The Role of My Boots in the Angolan Revolution), short stories, 1985
 Morska dežela na železniški postaji (The Land of Sea at the Railway Station), youth literature, 1986
 Velika ptičja zadeva (A Great Matter for Birds), youth literature, 1987
 Praznik republike ali abrakadabra (Republic Day or Abracadabra), short stories, 1987
 Golo morje (The Bare Sea), youth literature, 1988
 Strupena Brigita (Poisonous Bridget), youth literature, 1989
 Njen modri dežni plašč (Her Blue Rain Coat), novel, 1990
 Podmorski svet in mi (The Deapths of the Sea and Us), diving manual, 1991
 Pes z Atlantide (The Dog from Atlantis), novel, 1993
 Rum in šah (Rum and Chess), short stories, 1993
 Ozvezdje Jadran (The Adriatic Constellation), 1998
 Z masko v podvodni svet (Into the Depth with a Diving Mask), educational picture book, 1999
 Morje v času mrka (The Sea at the Time of the Eclipse), novel, 2000
 Leteča ladja (The Flying Boat), youth literature, 2002
 Morski portreti (Portraits of the Sea), educational, 2003
 Potapljanje Na Vdih & Podvodni Ribolov (Free Diving and Underwater Fishing), manual, 2004
 Morsko dno pripoveduje (The Seabed Tells), youth literature, 2004
 Golo morje (The Bare Sea), youth literature, 2005
 Kako dolg je čas (how long is time), short stories, 2019

References

Writers from Ljubljana
Slovenian translators
Living people
1945 births
Levstik Award laureates
University of Ljubljana alumni